Filiae Patriae (also korp! Filiae Patriae, abbreviated C!FP) is an Estonian student sorority (distinct from the North American understanding of said term); the oldest sorority in Estonia.

Filiae Patriae was founded on 27 October 1920 at the University of Tartu, and operated until 1940, when it was closed after Estonia was unlawfully incorporated into the Soviet Union. Sorority's activity continued in the West: chapters were founded in Canada, USA, Sweden, Australia and Brazil.

The sorority was re-established in 1988–89. Filiae Patriae also has friendship treaties with several overseas fraternities, such as the Hämäläis-Osakunta and Nylands Nation of the University of Helsinki, as well as Gästrike-Hälsinge nation of Uppsala University.

References

External links

Organizations established in 1920
1920 establishments in Estonia